The Ohio Education Association (OEA) is a teachers union which serves as the largest such organization for educators in the American state of Ohio. The organization represents teachers, educational support professionals, counselors, curriculum specialists, librarians, health care workers, school nurses, school psychologists, vocational-technical instructors, higher education, students and retirees in the state of Ohio.  As of 2018 it had 125,000 members. It serves as Ohio's branch organization for the National Education Association and mainly serves the smaller cities in the state, with the Ohio Federation of Teachers (representing the American Federation of Teachers) mainly serving Ohio's larger city school districts.

OEA represents the labor, policy, and professional interests of its members. OEA bargains compensation and benefits, protects members’ rights, and advocates for their professions.

References

Education trade unions
National Education Association

State wide trade unions in the United States
Trade unions in Ohio